UWC Mahindra College (sometimes known as the Mahindra United World College of India, or  MUWCI) is a pre-university international boarding school, located  west of Pune in Maharashtra, India. The college is a two-year programme with about 250 full-time boarders, and follows the International Baccalaureate (IB) Diploma Program (DP). It is one of the 18 United World Colleges. The school was established in 1997 with the support of Harish Mahindra and Anand Mahindra of the Mahindra Group.

History 
On 28 November 1997, Queen Noor of Jordan and Nelson Mandela inaugurated the UWC Mahindra College in India as one of the now eighteen United World Colleges (UWC) and the third UWC in Asia. The opening of the school was made possibly by a donation of land and building infrastructure by Harish Mahindra, of the Mahindra Group. The company and several members of the family remain involved with the college, with Keshub Mahindra serving as chair of the college, and the company continuing to fund student scholarships.

Campus 
The Mahindra United World College of India is one of eighteen campuses under the United World College banner, led by Nelson Mandela and Queen Noor of Jordan at the time of its design in the mid-1990s. The campus is divided into a residential and an academic area and was designed by architect Christopher Charles Benninger. The design incorporates traditional elements and local building materials. Benninger paid homage to traditional Indian architecture by incorporating elements such as wadas, staggered steps, and lotus ponds.

The college is located near the village of Paud in the Taluka Mulshi region of the western state of Maharashtra, India. The MUWCI campus is situated on a hill surrounded by rural communities and overlooking the valley of the Mula river near Mulshi Dam.

The residential side of campus is divided into communal clusters called "Wadas". The Wadas house between 40 and 60 students and 4-6 teachers and families. Students live in independent houses of eight students each, with communal courtyards. Teachers also serve as 'Wada parents' and 'House parents', providing a supportive residential learning context.

Academics 

UWC Mahindra College offers the International Baccalaureate Diploma. Students can also choose to do the UWC Mahindra College Project Based Diploma by pursuing a research project during their two years of study.

The following IB subjects are available at MUWCI, though offerings may change slightly year to year:
 Group 1: The Students' Best Language - English Literature (HL/SL), English Language And Literature (HL/SL), Spanish Literature (HL/SL), Hindi Literature (HL/SL), Language Self-Taught (HL/SL) 
 Group 2: Modern Language Acquisition -  English B (HL/SL), Hindi B (HL/SL), Spanish B (HL/SL), Spanish ab initio (SL), French B (HL/SL), French ab initio (SL), Arabic ab initio (SL)
 Group 3: Individuals and Societies - Psychology (HL/SL), Philosophy (HL/SL), Global Politics (HL), History (HL/SL), Economics (HL/SL), Environmental Systems and Societies (SL), Digital Society
 Group 4: Experimental Sciences - Physics (HL/SL), Chemistry (HL/SL), Biology (HL/SL), Environmental Systems and Societies (SL), Computer Science (HL/SL). 
 Group 5: Mathematics - Mathematics (HL/SL), Mathematical Studies (1 year or 2 years) (SL)
 Group 6: The Arts - Visual Arts (HL/SL), Film Studies (HL/SL), Theater (HL/SL). 
Apart from formal subjects, the experiential learning programme (known as Triveni at MUWCI) forms a significant part of the students' education. Triveni in Hindi means confluence of three rivers. Triveni is formed of three streams - (i) the IB CAS (Creativity, Action & Service) programme, (ii) Project & Travel Weeks (iii) a rich on-campus seminar and discussion series including This Is India, Global Affairs, guest speakers and more.

Students 
Students in UWC Mahindra College represent many different nationalities. The Class of 2018 represented 57 countries.

Admission 
Most students are nominated to attend UWC Mahindra College via their UWC National Committees. Indian students, residents and PIO/OCI students can apply via the United World College Committee of India. The selection process is rigorous, with an acceptance rate of 10-15%. The application process for Indian students starts in June and are finalized by January. The candidates are shortlisted based on potential to demonstrate UWC values and academic merit. Shortlisted candidates are invited to an overnight selection camp held at the UWCMC campus in Pune. During the camp, various activities are conducted including panel interviews, Group Discussions, Object-Presentation and various written and computer based tests. Based on the students' performance the committee nominates students to Mahindra UWC or any of the other United World Colleges.

Administration 
The founding Head of college, David Wilkinson, moved to Pune at the inception of UWC Mahindra College in 1997, having previously founded the Li Po Chun United World College in Hong Kong. In 2009, Jonathan Long was appointed as the Head of college and remained until 2011, when Pelham Lindfield Roberts joined. Soraya Sayed Hassen took on the role of Head of College in 2018, after Pelham Lindfield Roberts was appointed principal at UWC Changshu China. In July 2021, Dr. Dale Taylor took the role of Head of College. Thereafter, in July 2022, Gaurav Chopra stepped in as Interim Head of College. After a structured process of evaluating International candidates by all stakeholders, on the 23rd of Feb 2023, the Governing Board formally announced the unanimous choice of Gaurav Chopra, as the substantive next Head of College.

Alumni 
 Arvinn Gadgil, '99
 Valeria Luiselli
 Malaika Vaz, '15
 Aditya Jain, '18

References

External links 
 
 Plans and images at archnet.org

 

International Baccalaureate schools in India
United World Colleges
Mahindra Group
Private schools in Maharashtra
Education in Pune district
Educational institutions established in 1997
1997 establishments in Maharashtra